USS Henderson may refer to the following ships of the United States Navy:

 , a transport, commissioned in 1917. In 1943, she was converted to a hospital ship and commissioned as USS Bountiful (AH-9).
 , a destroyer, commissioned in 1946 and struck in 1980.

United States Navy ship names